Ami Selection is the second compilation album by Japanese recording artist Ami Suzuki, and her first released on the Avex label. It was released on December 7, 2011.

Album history
Despite being Ami's first greatest hits album on Avex, more than a half of the album consists of songs from the time when she was with Sony Music. For this album a total of 8 songs from Ami's Sony era were re-recorded with new vocals, including her debut single "Love the Island", and her first number one single, "Be Together". The newly recorded version of "Love the Island" was previously released on digital format, on July 27, 2011.

Singles that enjoyed moderate success, such as "Eventful", "Fantastic", "Like a Love?" or "One" didn't make to the final track listing.

The limited edition version comes with a DVD that includes music videos and some songs that were performed live at the 29th Anniversary Live.

Chart performance
The day it was released, the album peaked at nº 18 on the Oricon Daily charts. After the first week on sale the album reached nº 43 on the Oricon Weekly charts, selling 3,127 copies.

Track listing

Personnel
Ami Suzuki - vocals

References

2011 greatest hits albums